Janumpally Rameshwar Rao (1923–1998) was an Indian lawyer, diplomat, member of parliament, and book publisher. Rao joined Indian Foreign Service in 1949 and served as commissioner for the Government of India in various African nations. He was elected as a Member of Parliament  to the second, third, fourth, and fifth Lok Sabha successively during 1957–1977 from Mahabhubnagar constituency.

Life sketch
He was born on 23 February 1923 in Madras to a Raja Krishnadeva Rao and Rani Sarala Devi, belonging to the Wanaparthy Samasthanam. He was also the titular Raja of Wanaparthy from 1944 until 1971, when, by the 26th Amendment to the Constitution of India, the privy purses of the princes were abolished and official recognition of their titles came to an end.

He studied at Nizam College, Hyderabad, Madras University, and Bombay University. He joined the Indian Foreign Service in 1949. He established Orient Longman (now Orient Blackswan) as a specifically Indian book publishing company in 1948. He was First Secretary, Indian Commission in Nairobi, 1950—52; acted as Commissioner for the Government of India in East Africa, 1950-51; Commissioner for the Government of India in Gold Coast and Nigeria, 1953—56; previously associated with Socialist Wing of the Congress.

He was a Member of Parliament, 
 Second Lok Sabha, 1957— 62, 
 Third Lok Sabha, 1962—67 
 Fourth Lok Sabha, 1967—70 
 Fifth Lok Sabha, 1971—77, 

He was also Member of 
 Indian Delegation to the United Nations, 1958 
 United Nations Conciliation Commission for the Congo, 1960-61
 Indian Delegation to Afro-Asian Conference in Algiers, 1964-65.

He died at the age of 75 years in Hyderabad on 15 September 1998. He is survived by wife Shanta, one son and three daughters. Among his grandchildren are the actress Aditi Rao Hydari (his daughter's daughter), and Kiran Rao (his son's daughter) who is the Ex 
wife of actor Aamir Khan.

References

External links
 Profile of Janumpally Rameshwar Rao at Lok Sabha website.

1923 births
1998 deaths
India MPs 1957–1962
India MPs 1962–1967
India MPs 1967–1970
India MPs 1971–1977
India MPs 1977–1979
Lok Sabha members from Andhra Pradesh
20th-century Indian lawyers
Indian National Congress politicians from Telangana
People from Mahbubnagar district
People from Nagarkurnool district
People from Wanaparthy district